This is a list of rural localities in Kirov Oblast. Kirov Oblast (Kirovskaya oblast) is a federal subject of Russia (an oblast). Its administrative center is the city of Kirov. Population: 1,341,312 (2010 Census).

Locations 
 Damaskino
 Loyno
 Nizhnyaya Toyma
 Pochinok
 Salobelyak

See also 
 
 Lists of rural localities in Russia

References 

Kirov Oblast